Mei Ting (Chinese: 梅婷, born 30 April 1975) is a Chinese actress.
She received the Best Actress awards at the 22nd Cairo International Film Festival and 5th Huabiao Awards for her performance in "A Time to Remember".

Early life

In the 1980s, at age 7, Mei Ting enrolled in the "Art Troupe of Little Red Flowers" a famous art and performance group and school for talented children in Nan Jing, her home town. At age 9, she played a role in film The Moon in Moon Festival. When she was 13, she started her career as a dancer in "Song & Dance Troupe of Frontier Line". At 19 in 1994. she was invited to play a major role in the TV series Red Cherry.

Career
In 1996, Mei Ting was admitted into the prestige Central Academy of Drama in Beijing, Department of Acting. Among her classmates were Zhang Ziyi, Qin Hailu, Yuan Quan and Hu Jing, dubbed as the "Five Golden Flowers of the Class 1996". During her college years, she was already invited to act in a number of TV series. To everyone's surprise, the second year after her enrollment, she made a difficult decision to suspend her college study to dedicate herself fully to the appointed roles in a number of TV series.

In 1997, she played the role as "Qiu Qiu" in "A Time to Remember", with Leslie Cheung being "Jin", as a true to life character with exact and elaborate portrayal as well as exquisite depiction. She won the "Best Actress" award for her role in this film at the 22nd Cairo International Film Festival and Huabiao Awards. As an industrious and productive actress, Mei Ting acted in more than 10 movies and TV series between 1997 and 2001.

Personal life
She was married to film director Yan Po from 2001 until 2007.

In 2012, she married cinematographer Zeng Jian and has two children with him.

Filmography

Film

Television series

Stage plays

Awards

References

External links

1975 births
Living people
20th-century Chinese actresses
21st-century Chinese actresses
Actresses from Nanjing
Actresses from Jiangsu
Chinese film actresses
Chinese television actresses
Chinese voice actresses
Central Academy of Drama alumni